Josiah D. Arnold (November 1, 1820March 10, 1903) was an American businessman, Democratic politician, and Wisconsin pioneer.  He was the 16th mayor of Portage, Wisconsin (1877–1881), and represented Columbia County in the Wisconsin State Assembly for the 1878 session.

Biography

Arnold was born in Washington, Berkshire County, Massachusetts. Arnold moved to Janesville, Wisconsin Territory, in 1843. He then moved to Columbus, Columbia County, Wisconsin Territory in 1846 and finally moved to Portage, Wisconsin in 1852. Arnold was a merchant and lumber dealer. Arnold served as clerk of the Wisconsin Circuit Court for Columbia County in 1848 and 1849. He then served as register of deeds for Columbia County in 1851 and 1852. Arnold was a Democrat. From 1854 to 1858, Arnold served on the Portage Common Council. In 1877, Arnold served as mayor of Portage. In 1878, Arnold served in the Wisconsin Assembly. He moved back to Janesville and was in the real estate and insurance business.

Arnold died at his home in Janesville, Wisconsin from heart problems. He was buried at Oak Hill Cemetery in Janesville.

References

External links

1820 births
1903 deaths
People from Washington, Massachusetts
People from Janesville, Wisconsin
People from Portage, Wisconsin
Businesspeople from Wisconsin
County officials in Wisconsin
Mayors of places in Wisconsin
Wisconsin city council members
19th-century American politicians
19th-century American businesspeople
Democratic Party members of the Wisconsin State Assembly